Bresnica (in older sources Breznica) is a settlement in the Municipality of Ormož  in northeastern Slovenia. The area belongs to the traditional Styria region and is now included in the Drava Statistical Region.

Name
Before the Second World War, the village was named Breznica. It was known as Wresnitzen in German in the past.

References

External links
Bresnica on Geopedia

Populated places in the Municipality of Ormož